Nassaria acutispirata (also known as Microfusus acutispirata obesiformis) is a species of Nassariidae. 

The species is distributed offshore of Iwate Prefecture. The species was first described by George Brettingham Sowerby III in 1913.

References

External links

Nassariidae
Gastropods described in 1913
Marine gastropods